"Splitting Up Christmas", from the 2003 album Make the Clocks Move, is a UK Christmas single by Kevin Devine released in support of the 2009 Big Scary Monsters Christmas Tour. At each date on the tour, an exclusive CD single was sold, limited to 25 copies, hand-numbered and signed by Devine. Each date's CD had its own exclusive B-side.

On December 12, 2009, the title track was offered as a free MP3 download on the record label's website. On December 17, 2009, the single was made available as a limited digital download with all nine B-sides, only available until December 31, 2009.

Both the CDs and MP3 downloads are now unavailable.

Track listing

Seven of the B-sides were previously released on the 2007 Tour EP. "Lord, I Know We Don't Talk" and "Write Your Story Now" (live at Old Blue Last) were previously unreleased.

References

American rock songs
2003 songs
2009 singles